Abdulkhaleq Barnawi  [عبد الخالق برناوي in Arabic] (born 10 October 1984) is a Saudi football player. He currently plays for Al-Wahda FC.

External links 
 

1984 births
Living people
Saudi Arabian footballers
Al-Wehda Club (Mecca) players
Saudi First Division League players
Saudi Professional League players
Association football midfielders